Robert Lynn may refer to:

 Sir Robert Lynn (Northern Ireland politician) (Robert John Lynn, 1873–1945), Ulster Unionist Party politician
 Robert J. Lynn (New Hampshire judge) (born 1964), justice of the New Hampshire Supreme Court
 Robert Lynn (director) (1918–1982), British film and TV director
 Robert L. Lynn (1931–2020), American poet
 Robert Lynn (Australian politician) (1873–1928), Australian businessman and politician
 Robert Lynn (water polo) (born 1967), American water polo player

See also
Robert Lyne (1885–1957), Welsh field hockey player
Robert Linn (disambiguation)